Lucheng is a town of Lingchuan County in southeastern Shanxi province, China, located  south of the county seat and about  northwest of the border with Henan as the crow flies. , it has 44 villages under its administration.

See also
List of township-level divisions of Shanxi

References

Township-level divisions of Shanxi